Sphinctomyrmex is a genus of ants in the subfamily Dorylinae. The genus is a tropical and distinctive group, originally described by Mayr based on a single gyne collected in Brazil. Morphologically, the genus is characterized by the unique arrangement of the gastric segments, which are nearly equal in length and separated from each other by distinct constrictions. Very little is known on the natural history of Sphinctomyrmex. The few observations so far suggest that ants of this genus are nomadic predators of other ants. The genus  Zasphinctus and approximately 20 species were formerly included, but were split out during revision of the Dorylinae genera by Borowiec (2016).

Species

 Sphinctomyrmex marcoyi 
 Sphinctomyrmex schoerederi 
 Sphinctomyrmex stali

References

External links

Dorylinae
Ant genera
Hymenoptera of South America